Cinna or Kinna was a town of ancient Galatia. It was also the seat of a bishop; no longer a residential see, it remains a titular see of the Roman Catholic Church.

Location
Its site is located near Karahamzılı, Asiatic Turkey.
The exact location of Cinna is now lost though it is thought to have been near village of Balyk Koyounji (vilayet of Angora) in a rich corn-growing area, west of Ankara.

History
During the late Roman Empire the town was a seat of a bishop, several of whom are known to us.
 Gregorius, attendee at Council of Niceae 325
 Philumenus of Cinna
 Acacius
 Daniel
 Amiantus
 Plato
 George
 Synesius
 Thrasius
 Antonius

References

Populated places in ancient Galatia
Former populated places in Turkey
Roman towns and cities in Turkey
Populated places of the Byzantine Empire
History of Konya Province